Sydney Rae Leroux (born May 7, 1990) is a professional soccer player and Olympic gold medalist who currently plays as a forward for Angel City FC in the National Women's Soccer League (NWSL).

Born in Canada to a Canadian mother and an American father, Sydney came up through the Canadian system and represented Canada at various youth levels, until she chose to play for the United States women's national under-20 soccer team starting in 2008 and later began playing for the U.S. senior national team in 2012. Leroux has earned over 75 caps with the senior national team and was part of the Americans' winning squads at the 2012 London Olympics and 2015 Women's World Cup.

Leroux played collegiate soccer in NCAA Division I for UCLA Bruins women's soccer and at the semi-professional level for the Vancouver Whitecaps. She made her debut for the Whitecaps at the age of fifteen, becoming the youngest player ever to play for the team. Leroux was the number one pick by the Atlanta Beat during the 2012 WPS Draft on January 13, 2012. Following the suspension of the league in early 2012, she played for the Seattle Sounders Women during the summer of the same year.

In 2013, she made her professional debut for the Boston Breakers in the NWSL during the league's inaugural season. She was later traded to Seattle Reign FC in 2014, Western New York Flash for the 2015 season and FC Kansas City prior to the 2016 season.

Early life
Leroux was born in Surrey, British Columbia, to a white Canadian mother, Sandi Leroux, and a black American father, Ray Chadwick. Her mother played third base for the Canadian national softball team. Her father was a professional baseball player who pitched briefly for the California Angels in 1986. Coming from a family of baseball players, Leroux played baseball for Whalley Little League from 1994 to 2004. Leroux was raised primarily by her mother after her parents split when her mother was three months pregnant with her.

During her freshman and sophomore year of high school, Leroux attended Johnston Heights Secondary School in Surrey where she was the leading scorer on the soccer team. Also a track and field athlete, she won Provincials in the 4 × 100 metres relay with her team. Leroux played three seasons of club soccer with Coquitlam City Wild, helping the team to Provincial Cup Championships in 2003, 2004 and 2005. Leroux's prolific goalscoring helped the team win the under-14 national championship in 2003. She secured a bronze medal in helping the team finish third at the under-16 national tournament in 2005. Leroux became the youngest player to play for the Vancouver Whitecaps of the W-League at the age of 15. She also won a championship as part of a British Columbia select team at the Canada Games in 2005.

Leroux stated that at a very early age, she knew she wanted to play for the United States women's national soccer team. To pursue her goal, she moved to Scottsdale, Arizona at the age of 15 and attended Horizon High School during her junior and senior years while living with multiple host families. Despite having a challenging time adjusting to life without her family and friends, she helped lead Sereno Soccer Club to state titles in 2007 and 2008. Of her move to the United States, she said, "It was not easy. It was probably one of the most difficult things I ever had to do, move away from everything that I knew and was comfortable with to something that I had no idea about. Not having any family around. Doing it on my own. As a 15-year-old, that's kind of hard. I had to grow up really fast [...] But I guess it's all worth it. Now I have a chance to prove myself, and that's what I enjoy, and that's why I did what I did."

College career
Leroux played collegiate soccer for UCLA from 2008 to 2011, under head coaches Jill Ellis (2008–10) and B. J. Snow (2011). During her freshman season, she started 18 of the 19 games in which she played. She was the sixth-highest scorer on the team with five goals and six assists for a total of 16 points on the season, and was named to the All-Freshman Team in the Pacific-10 Conference (Pac-10). During her second year, she led UCLA in scoring with 48 points (23 goals, two assists) and was a semi-finalist for the Hermann Trophy. Her 23 goals ranked second in the Pac-10 and tied with teammate Lauren Cheney for a new single-season record at UCLA. Leroux earned Soccer America MVP second team, Second-team All-Pac-10, and 2009 NCAA All-Tournament Team honors the same year. During the first round of the NCAA Division I Women's Soccer Tournament, she tied the school's record for most goals scored in a single match after scoring four during the team's 7–1 defeat of Boise State.

As a junior, Leroux ranked fifth in UCLA history for career points (91) as well as fourth in goals (41) and game-winning goals (15). She ranked third in the Pac-10 for goals (13) and second in game-winning goals (6) earning her First-team Soccer America MVP, Third-team NSCAA All-American, First-team NSCAA All-Pacific Region, and First-team All-Pac-10 honors the same year. During the Bruins' first game of her junior season in 2010, she scored four goals against Cal Poly Pomona helping her team win 7–0. She was subsequently named Pac-10 Player of the Week. Leroux scored the game-winning goal during the second round of the 2010 NCAA Tournament helping the Bruins defeat the UCF Knights 2–1 and advance to the third round where they lost to Stanford.

During her final year with the Bruins in 2011, she led the team in scoring for the third straight season with 16 goals and three assists for a total of 35 points. She was named First-team NSCAA All-American, Soccer America's MVP First Team, and was a semi-finalist for the Hermann Trophy. She scored eight game-winning goals, more than any other player in the newly renamed Pac-12 Conference. She scored her first hat trick of the season (the third of her collegiate career) in 21 minutes during a 6–1 win over Arizona State in October 2011. At the Bruins' next game against Colorado, Leroux scored another hat trick helping her team win 8–0. She finished her collegiate career ranked fourth in UCLA's record books for points (126), goals (57), and game-winning goals (23).

Club career

Vancouver Whitecaps, 2005 and 2011

Leroux played for the Vancouver Whitecaps during the 2005 W-League season, becoming the youngest player to ever play for the team aged 15 years and seven days. She returned to the Whitecaps for the 2011 season. She ranked second in the league for goals scored with 11 finishing the regular season with 24 points in 11 appearances. After helping the Whitecaps advance to the W-League Championship Final Four with a goal during the team's 4–3 defeat of Santa Clarita Blue Heat in the Western Conference Final, Leroux was named to the All-Western Conference team. Post-season, she was named 2011 W-League Rookie of the Year.

WPS Draft and Seattle Sounders Women, 2012
Leroux was the number one pick by the Atlanta Beat in the 2012 WPS Draft, though the league folded before she could play for the team. During the summer of 2012, Leroux joined fellow U.S. national team players, Hope Solo, Alex Morgan, Stephanie Cox, and Megan Rapinoe on the Seattle Sounders Women in the W-League. Sounders Women head coach, Michelle French, said of the signing, "Sydney is the consummate goal scorer with an incredible attacking attitude. She not only shows tireless effort on the offensive side of the ball, but she is very unique in that she prides herself on her defensive recovery and ability to win the ball back. She makes an impact no matter where she plays on the field." Due to her national team commitments and preparation for the 2012 Summer Olympics, Leroux made only two regular season appearances for the club. She scored two goals and served one assist in her 168 minutes on the pitch. With the national teammates' presence on the team, the Sounders sold out nine of their ten home matches at the 4,500 capacity Starfire Stadium. Average attendance during the 2012 season for the Sounders Women was four times higher than the next closest team.

Boston Breakers, 2013

In January 2013, Heather O'Reilly, Heather Mitts and Leroux were the three United States national team players allocated to the Boston Breakers for the inaugural season of the National Women's Soccer League (NWSL). She scored her first goal of the season in the 91st minute of the Breakers' season opener against the Washington Spirit, tying the game 1–1 in stoppage time. Leroux scored the league's first ever hat trick during the Breakers' 4–1 win against the Chicago Red Stars on May 4 and was subsequently named NWSL Player of the Week. On July 3, she scored another equalizer against the Seattle Reign FC, resulting in a 1–1 draw. A few days later on July 6, she scored two goals against the Portland Thorns FC resulting in a 2–0 win for the Breakers in front of 12,436 fans at Jeld-Wen Field.

Leroux's 11 goals scored during the season tied for second with national teammate Abby Wambach of the Western New York Flash. Lauren Holiday of FC Kansas City was in first place with 12. The Breakers finished the 2013 season fifth in the league with an  record.

Seattle Reign FC, 2014
On November 18, 2013, it was announced that Leroux had been traded to the Seattle Reign FC for the 2014 NWSL season in exchange for Kristie Mewis, Michelle Betos and the Reign's first two picks in the 2015 draft. Ebullient Reign FC head coach Laura Harvey hailed the signing of Leroux: "One of the world's best forwards. She is a young, extraordinary talent with unlimited upside. Sydney will be the consistent goal-scoring threat that we struggled to find last season."

During the 2014 season, the Reign set a league record unbeaten streak of 16 games during the first part of the season. During the 16 game stretch, the Reign compiled a 13–0–3 record. The Reign finished first in the regular season clinching the NWSL Shield for the first time. After defeating the Washington Spirit 2–1 in the playoff semi-finals, the Reign were defeated 2–1 by FC Kansas City during the championship final. Leroux finished the 2014 season with five goals in 22 games played. In March 2015, it was announced that she was traded to Western New York Flash.

Western New York Flash, 2015
Due to her participation in the 2015 FIFA Women's World Cup and an ankle injury, Leroux played only three games for the Flash. She scored once in those three games.

FC Kansas City, 2016–2017
On January 13, 2016, Leroux was traded to FC Kansas City. Leroux announced later that month that she was pregnant. Due to her pregnancy, she missed the 2016 NWSL season.

She returned to play for FC Kansas City in 2017. She scored a goal in the first game of the season, a 2–0 win over the Boston Breakers. She played in 23 games for FCKC in 2017, and scored 6 goals. Kansas City finished the season in sixth place and did not qualify for the playoffs. After FCKC ceased operations following the 2017 season, her rights were transferred to the Utah Royals.

Orlando Pride, 2018–2022
On February 2, 2018, Leroux was traded to the Orlando Pride for Orlando's first round pick in the 2019 NWSL College Draft. Prior to the 2018 NWSL season, Leroux signed a contract with the Orlando Pride as she was no longer an allocated player by U.S. Soccer.

In March 2019, at six months pregnant with her daughter, Leroux returned to pre-season training. She returned to playing during the 2019 season, making an 86th minute substitute appearance against Sky Blue FC on September 29, just three months after giving birth.

She signed a three-year contract extension with an additional one-year option ahead of the 2021 season.

Angel City FC, 2022–present
On June 29, 2022, Angel City FC acquired Leroux in exchange for $75,000 in allocation money and Angel City's natural first-round pick in the 2024 NWSL Draft.

International career

Youth national teams
By virtue of her parents' nationalities, Leroux was eligible to represent either Canada or the United States. Playing for Canada at the age of 14, she was the youngest individual to participate in the 2004 FIFA U-19 Women's World Cup, held in Thailand. She served as captain of Canada's under-15 team that traveled to Germany in 2005.

Leroux received clearance from FIFA to change her allegiance to the United States in 2008 and went on to help the under-20 national team win the 2008 FIFA U-20 Women's World Cup in Santiago, Chile. She scored in the first half of the final against North Korea. She represented the United States at the 2010 FIFA U-20 Women's World Cup and ended her under-20 career as the country's all-time leading scorer in Under-20 Women's World Cup play with 10 goals. At the under-20 level, she is among the country's most capped players with 36 games and is the all-time leading scorer for the U.S. with 30 goals. In 2012, she was named the 2011 U.S. Soccer Young Female Athlete of the Year, playing for both the senior and under-23 national teams.

U.S. senior national team

Leroux played at the 2012 CONCACAF Women's Olympic Qualifying Tournament as a member of the United States senior national team. In her second cap for the senior side, Leroux scored five goals in a CONCACAF Olympic qualifying match between the U.S. and Guatemala; the final score of the match was 13–0. Leroux's performance tied the record for goals scored in a single match by one player in a CONCACAF Olympic Qualifying Tournament. She also tied the single-game record for the national team, equaling previous performances by her teammates Amy Rodriguez and Abby Wambach in 2012 and 2004 respectively.

In 2012, Leroux set a new team scoring record as a reserve on the team with 12 goals scored off the bench in one year. The previous record of nine goals was set by Debbie Keller in 1998.

From Algarve to the London Olympics, 2012

During the 2012 Algarve Cup in Portugal, Leroux scored the team's fifth goal in the 93rd minute of the U.S.' first group stage match against Denmark, in which the U.S. won 5–0. During the team's second group stage match, she scored the game-winning goal against Norway in the 81st minute. After losing to Japan in the third group stage match, the team defeated Sweden 4–0 to clinch third place at the tournament.

Leroux was the youngest player and a goal-scoring member of the Olympic gold medal-winning team at the 2012 Summer Olympics in London. She scored the second goal against New Zealand during the quarter final match of the tournament helping the U.S. win 2–0.

Algarve Cup, Controversy in Toronto, 2013

During the team's second group stage match at the 2013 Algarve Cup, Leroux opened the scoring for the U.S. when she netted a goal in the 13th minute. Her goal was followed by four others from her teammates resulting in a 5–0 win over China. The U.S. went on to win the tournament after defeating Germany 2–0 in the final.

While playing in a sold-out friendly match against Canada at BMO Field in Toronto, Ontario in June 2013, Leroux was booed by Canadian fans throughout the match. After scoring during stoppage time to bring the score to 3–0 in favor of the U.S., Leroux celebrated her goal by hushing the crowd and pointing to the U.S. emblem on her jersey which further inflamed many fans in the crowd. After the game, she stated via Twitter, "When you chant racial slurs, taunt me and talk about my family don't be mad when I shush you and show pride in what I represent. #america." The U.S. Soccer Federation announced that Leroux had "endured abuse both verbally and in social media" since switching to the U.S. national soccer team in 2008; however, Leroux later clarified that no such incidents took place at BMO Field. "My tweet from this morning wasn't in response to anything from yesterday's match at BMO Field. In fact, the atmosphere at the stadium was a positive step forward for women's soccer. Unfortunately, the type of abuse I have received in the past and via social media for my decision to play for the United States is a step backwards. That is what prompted my response in the heat of the moment."

During a friendly against Mexico in September 2013, Leroux scored a hat trick in nine minutes, helping the U.S. win 7–0.

2015 FIFA Women's World Cup
Leroux was on the roster of the United States team for the 2015 FIFA Women's World Cup. She saw action in four of the seven games, recording an assist to a Christen Press goal in the opening game against Australia. She did not play in the Final against Japan

Post World Cup-present
On July 17, 2015, it was announced that Leroux would undergo ankle surgery, which would sideline her for three months. As a result, she would miss the remainder of the 2015 NWSL Season and the U.S. WNT World Cup Victory Tour.

Leroux announced her pregnancy on January 26, 2016; as a result, she did not play in 2016.

On May 27, 2017, Leroux was named to the U.S. Roster for a set of friendlies in Scandinavia. This was her first time suiting up for the U.S. since giving birth to her son. Leroux did not play in either game. Leroux was named to the roster for the 2017 Tournament of Nations. She didn't play in the first match for the U.S., but entered as a second-half substitute in their second match against Brazil. This was her first appearance for the U.S. since the semi-final of the 2015 World Cup, on June 30, 2015.

Leroux has not received a call-up since the 2017 Tournament of Nations, and she was not listed on the 35 player previsional roster for the 2018 CONCACAF Women's Championship.

Personal life
Leroux holds dual citizenship in Canada and the United States. Her nickname is "Syd the Kid". Her chihuahua, "Boss Leroux", has thousands of Twitter followers and was often featured in the media along with Sydney.

Leroux became engaged to Canadian-born Major League Baseball player Brett Lawrie, a childhood acquaintance, in October 2010 before the engagement was called off the following year.

Leroux had been in a relationship with English-born MLS player Dom Dwyer from 2014. On February 14, 2015 (Valentine's Day, or 2-14; her USWNT jersey number is 2 and Dwyer's is 14), it was announced that she and Dwyer had wed in January 2015 in a private ceremony. On January 25, 2016, Sydney announced on social media that she was expecting the couple's first child in September 2016. Cassius Cruz Dwyer was born on September 10, 2016. On November 28, 2018, they announced they were expecting their second child. In March 2019, at six months pregnant, Leroux was photographed participating in light preseason training with the image causing controversy; drawing both criticism and praise. Their daughter, Roux James Dwyer, was born on June 28, 2019. She returned to playing three months after giving birth. On August 6, 2021, Leroux announced that she and Dwyer were divorcing, after six years of marriage.

Endorsements
Leroux has appeared in several advertisements and promotional pieces for Nike. In December 2013, she and national teammate Alex Morgan were featured in Nike's "Winning in a Winter Wonderland" commercial along with other professional athletes including Robinson Canó, Justin Tuck, and Julia Mancuso. In June 2014, she signed an endorsement deal with Nestlé Nesquik. The same month, she made a cameo appearance in a commercial for Beats by Dre in preparation for the 2014 FIFA World Cup. In June 2014, she became the first female endorser for the sports drink company BODYARMOR, joining fellow professional athletes Richard Sherman, Kevin Love, and James Harden. In 2022, Sydney partnered with DIRECTV  to release the Undercover Coach video, promoting the brand's partnership with LeagueSide and reminding us the future is female.

In popular culture

Television and video
Leroux was the focus of an ESPN feature entitled Living Her Dream, which profiled her evolution as an international soccer player. She was a guest on Canada's Breakfast Television in August 2012 following the 2012 Olympics. In October 2013, she was interviewed by Grete Eliassen for an ESPNW short feature, Q&A With Sydney Leroux. The same month, she was profiled in Fox Soccer Exclusive: Sydney Leroux for Fox Soccer Channel. In December 2013, Leroux was featured in episode 9 of AOL's online series, My Ink. Leroux appeared as a dining room guest on an episode of Hell's Kitchen.

Magazines
Leroux was one of 21 professional athletes featured in ESPN's The Body Issue in 2013. She appeared semi-nude on one of eight covers for the magazine. Of the experience she said, I think a lot of females struggle with the way they look, and I wanted to show that everyone's body is different. I think it's a big deal to be an athlete and feel confident in your body and show it off. I'm not going to say I've never struggled with how I look, but I've reached a point in my life where I'm happy with who I am.

In May 2015, Leroux was featured on the cover of ESPN Magazine with teammates Abby Wambach and Alex Morgan.

Video games
Leroux has featured along with her national teammates in multiple editions of the EA Sports' FIFA video game series with FIFA 16 the first to include female players.

Ticker tape parade and White House honor
Following the United States' win at the 2015 FIFA Women's World Cup, Leroux and her teammates became the first women's sports team to be honored with a ticker tape parade in New York City. Each player received a key to the city from Mayor Bill de Blasio. In October of the same year, the team was honored by President Barack Obama at the White House.

Career statistics

Club
.

International goals

Honors
Seattle Reign FC
NWSL Shield: 2014
United States
 FIFA Women's World Cup: 2015
 Olympic Gold Medal: 2012
 CONCACAF Women's Championship: 2014
 CONCACAF Women's Olympic Qualifying Tournament: 2012
 Algarve Cup: 2013, 2015
United States U20

 FIFA U-20 Women's World Cup: 2008
 CONCACAF Women's U-20 Championship: 2010; runner-up: 2008
Individual
 FIFA U-20 Women's World Cup Golden Boot: 2008
FIFA U-20 Women's World Cup Golden Ball: 2008
FIFA U-20 Women's World Cup Bronze Ball: 2010
FIFA U-20 Women's World Cup All-star team: 2008, 2010

 CONCACAF Women's U-20 Championship Golden Boot: 2010

 CONCACAF Women's U-20 Championship Golden Ball: 2010
 U.S. Soccer Young Female Athlete of the Year: 2011
NWSL Best XI: 2013
 NWSL Second XI: 2021

See also

 List of FIFA Women's World Cup winning players
 List of Olympic medalists in football
 List of UCLA professional athletes

References

Match reports

External links

 
 Orlando Pride player profile
 UCLA player profile
 US Soccer player profile
 

1990 births
Living people
2015 FIFA Women's World Cup players
American women's soccer players
Boston Breakers players
Canadian people of African-American descent
Sportspeople of American descent
FIFA Women's World Cup-winning players
Footballers at the 2012 Summer Olympics
Franco-Columbian people
Medalists at the 2012 Summer Olympics
National Women's Soccer League players
Olympic gold medalists for the United States in soccer
OL Reign players
Seattle Sounders Women players
Soccer people from British Columbia
Sportspeople from Surrey, British Columbia
UCLA Bruins women's soccer players
United States women's international soccer players
USL W-League (1995–2015) players
Vancouver Whitecaps FC (women) players
Western New York Flash players
Women's association football forwards
Canadian women's soccer players
FC Kansas City players
Orlando Pride players
Angel City FC players
United States women's under-20 international soccer players
American people of French-Canadian descent
African-American women's soccer players
Black Canadian women's soccer players
Canadian emigrants to the United States
Citizens of the United States through descent
Black Canadian sportswomen